Xylomya pallidifemur is a species of fly in the family Xylomyidae.

Distribution
Canada, United States.

References

Xylomyidae
Insects described in 1917
Taxa named by John Russell Malloch
Diptera of North America